Petersburg is an unincorporated community in Henry County, in the U.S. state of Missouri.

History
Variant names were "Carrsville" and "Petersburgh". Petersburg was originally called Carrsville, and under the latter name was founded in the 1870s, taking its name from Carrsville Mill. A post office called Carrsville was established in 1872, the name was changed to Petersburgh in 1881, and the post office closed in 1902. The present name honors Peter Lane, a local merchant.

References

Unincorporated communities in Henry County, Missouri
Unincorporated communities in Missouri